Nicole Provis and Mark Woodforde were the defending champions but lost in the second round to Nana Miyagi and Kent Kinnear.

Arantxa Sánchez Vicario and Todd Woodbridge won in the final 7–5, 6–4 against Zina Garrison-Jackson and Rick Leach.

Seeds
Champion seeds are indicated in bold text while text in italics indicates the round in which those seeds were eliminated.

Draw

Final

Top half

Bottom half

References
 1993 Australian Open – Doubles draws and results at the International Tennis Federation

Mixed Doubles
Australian Open (tennis) by year – Mixed doubles